Bremen (Low German also: Breem or Bräm), officially the City Municipality of Bremen, is the capital of the German state Free Hanseatic City of Bremen (Freie Hansestadt Bremen), a two-city-state consisting of the cities of Bremen and Bremerhaven. With about 570,000 inhabitants, the Hanseatic city is the 11th largest city of Germany and the second largest city in Northern Germany after Hamburg.

A commercial and industrial city, Bremen is, together with Oldenburg and Bremerhaven, part of the Bremen/Oldenburg Metropolitan Region, with 2.5 million people. Bremen is contiguous with the Lower Saxon towns of Delmenhorst, Stuhr, Achim, Weyhe, Schwanewede and Lilienthal. There is an exclave of Bremen in Bremerhaven, the "Citybremian Overseas Port Area Bremerhaven" (Stadtbremisches Überseehafengebiet Bremerhaven). Bremen is the fourth largest city in the Low German dialect area after Hamburg, Dortmund and Essen.

Bremen's port, together with the port of Bremerhaven at the mouth of the Weser, is the second largest port in Germany after the Port of Hamburg. The airport of Bremen (Flughafen Bremen "Hans Koschnick") lies in the southern borough of Neustadt-Neuenland and is Germany's 12th busiest airport.

Bremen is a major cultural and economic hub of Northern Germany. The city is home to dozens of historical galleries and museums, ranging from historical sculptures to major art museums, such as the Bremen Overseas Museum (Übersee-Museum Bremen). The Bremen City Hall and the Bremen Roland are UNESCO World Heritage Sites. Bremen is well known through the Brothers Grimm's fairy tale "Town Musicians of Bremen" (Die Bremer Stadtmusikanten), and there is a statue dedicated to it in front of the city hall.

Bremen has a reputation as a working-class city. The city is home to many multinationals and manufacturing companies headquartered in Bremen include Hachez chocolate and Vector Foiltec. Bundesliga club SV Werder Bremen play in the Weserstadion on the bank of the Weser.


History 

For most of its 1,200 year history, Bremen was an independent city within the confederal jurisdiction of Germany's Holy Roman Empire. Its governing merchants and guilds were at the centre of the Hanseatic League that sought to monopolise the North Sea and Baltic Sea trade. To enlarge and confirm its independence, the city had, until the Reformation, to contend with the temporal power of the Church, and after the Thirty Years War with Sweden, the masters of the surrounding Duchy of Bremen-Verden.

In the late nineteenth century, Bremen was drawn by Prussia into the German Empire. With its new sea anchorage and wharves at Bremerhaven, it was the principal port of embarkation for German and central European emigrants to the Americas, and an entrepôt for Germany's late developing colonial trade. The Norddeutscher Lloyd (NDL), founded in Bremen in 1857, became one of the world's leading shipping companies.

In the twentieth century, Bremen, a broadly liberal and social-democratic city, lost its autonomy under the Hitler regime. After World War Two, in which almost two thirds of the city's fabric was destroyed, this was restored. Bremen became one of the founding Bundesländer (or states) of West Germany.

Geography

Opposite Bremen's Altstadt is the point where the "Middle Weser" becomes the "Lower Weser" and, from the area of Bremen's port, the river has been made navigable to ocean-going vessels. The region on the left bank of the Lower Weser, through which the Ochtum flows, is the Weser Marshes, the landscape on its right bank is part of the Elbe-Weser Triangle. The Lesum, and its tributaries, the Wümme and Hamme, the Schönebecker Aue and Blumenthaler Aue, are the downstream tributaries of the Weser.

In terms of area, Bremen is the thirteenth largest city in Germany; and in terms of population the second largest city in northwest Germany after Hamburg and the eleventh largest in the whole of Germany (see: List of cities in Germany).

Part of Bremerhaven's port territory forms an exclave of the City of Bremen.

Hills of Bremen 
The inner city lies on a Weser dune, which reaches a natural height of 10.5 metres (34 feet, 6 inches) above sea level at Bremen Cathedral; its highest point, though, is 14.4 metres (47 feet, 3 inches) above sea level and lies to the east at the Polizeihaus, Am Wall 196. The highest natural feature in the city of Bremen is 32.5 metres (107 feet) above sea level and lies in Friedehorst Park in the northwestern borough of Burglesum. As a result, Bremen has the lowest high point of all the German states.

Climate 
Bremen has a moderate oceanic climate (Köppen climate classification Cfb) due to its proximity to the North Sea coast and temperate maritime air masses that move in with the predominantly westerly winds from the Atlantic Ocean. However, periods in which continental air masses predominate may occur at any time of the year and can lead to heat waves in the summer and prolonged periods of frost in the winter. In general though, extremes are rare in Bremen and temperatures below  and above  occur only once every couple of years. On 13 October 2018, Bremen recorded its warmest October day on record with 28.6 °C (83.4 °F). However, the astronomer Heinrich Wilhelm Matthias Olbers reported to have measured −27.3 °C on 23 January 1823. Being at some distance from the main North Sea, Bremen still has a somewhat wider temperature range than Bremerhaven that is located on the mouth of Weser.

Average temperatures have risen continually over the last decades, leading to a  rise in the mean annual temperature between 1961–90 and 1981–2010 reference periods. As in most parts of Germany, the year 2014 has been the warmest year on record averaging , making Bremen the second-warmest German state after Berlin in 2014. While Bremen is located in the comparatively cloudy northwestern part of Germany, there has been a significant increase in average sunshine hours over the last decades, especially in the months of April, May, and July, causing the annual mean to rise by 121 hours between the reference periods of 1961–90 and 1991–2020. This trend has continued over the last 10 years (2011–2020), which average 1680 hours of sunshine, almost 200 hours more than in the international reference period of 1961–90. Nevertheless, especially the winters remain extremely gloomy by international standards with December averaging hardly more than one hour of sunshine (out of 7 astronomically possible) per day, a feature that Bremen shares with most of Germany and its neighbouring countries, though.

Precipitation is distributed fairly even around the year with a small peak in summer mainly due to convective precipitation, i.e. showers and thunderstorms. Snowfall and the period of snow cover are variable; whereas in some years, hardly any snow accumulation occurs, there has recently been a series of unusually snowy winters, peaking in the record year 2010 counting 84 days with a snow cover. Nevertheless, snow accumulation of more than 20 centimetres (8 in) remains exceptional, the record being  of snow on 18 February 1979.

Typical of its maritime location, autumn tends to remain mild well into October, while spring arrives later than in the southwestern parts of the country.

Population 

Bremen's economy boomed in line with the West German Wirtschaftswunder of the 1950s and 60s. This saw the growth, and permanent settlement, of a large migrant worker population, drawn largely from Turkey and southern Europe. A new wave immigration occurred after the turn of new century, following the entry of Poland, Bulgaria and other former East Bloc countries into the European Union, and after 2015 with the settlement of refugees from Syria and other war-torn regions.

By the second decade of the century out of a population (including Bremerhaven) of approximately 680,000, over 115,000 had foreign citizenship, and nearly twice that number, almost a third of the total population, could be classified as having non-German origin/ethnicity.

Number of minorities in Bremen by nationality as of 31 December 2021:

The recent influx has somewhat moderated the tendency toward an accelerated ageing of the population. As it is, more than half the population of the state of Bremen are over 50, and more than a quarter are over 60.

Politics 
The  (municipal assembly) is made up of 68 of the 83 legislators of the state legislature, the Bremische Bürgerschaft who reside in the city of Bremen. The legislature is elected by the citizens of Bremen every four years.

Bremen has a reputation as a left-wing city. The port, shipyards and related industries sustained a large and unionised working class. This translated into support for the Social Democrats, considered Bremen's natural governing party. However, in the 1980s mechanization of the port and closure of the city's leading shipbuilder induced an employment crisis and shook the confidence of the party's traditional voter base. The SPD, which had still polled 51% in 1987, lost its effective majority. The once dominant left-liberal vote split, and coalition government became the norm. The state today is governed by a coalition of the Social Democratic Party, The Greens and The Left.

In November 2019 the right-wing group Phalanx 18 was banned by the city-state of Bremen.

One of the two mayors is elected President of the Senate and serves as head of the city and the state. The current mayor is Andreas Bovenschulte.

Last state election

State election 2015 

Provisional results; the AfD did not reach the 5% threshold in Bremerhaven (and will hence only receive seats for votes from Bremen), the BIW did not reach the threshold in Bremen (and will only receive one seat in Bremerhaven, none in Bremen).

Administrative structure

Main sights 
 Many of the sights in Bremen are found in the Altstadt (Old Town), an oval area surrounded by the Weser River, on the southwest, and the Wallgraben, the former moats of the medieval city walls, on the northeast. The oldest part of the Altstadt is the southeast half, starting with the Marktplatz and ending at the Schnoor quarter.
 The Marktplatz (Market square) is dominated by the opulent façade of the Town Hall of Bremen. The building was erected between 1405 and 1410 in Gothic style, but the façade was built two centuries later (1609–12) in Renaissance style. The Town Hall is the seat of the president of the Senate of Bremen. Today, it hosts a restaurant in original decor with gigantic wine barrels, the Ratskeller in Bremen, and the wine list boasts more than 600 – exclusively German – wines. It is also home of the twelve oldest wines in the world, stored in their original barrels in the Apostel chamber. In July 2004, along with the Bremen Roland, the building was added to the list of UNESCO World Heritage Sites.
 Two statues stand to the west side of the Town Hall: one is the statue Bremen Roland (1404) of the city's protector, Roland, with his view against the Cathedral and bearing Durendart, the "sword of justice" and a shield decorated with an imperial eagle. The other near the entrance to the Ratskeller is Gerhard Marcks' bronze sculpture (1953) Die Stadtmusikanten (Town Musicians), which portrays the donkey, dog, cat and rooster of the Grimm Brothers' fairy tale.
 Other interesting buildings in the vicinity of the Marktplatz are the Schütting, a sixteenth-century Flemish-inspired guild hall, Rathscafé, Raths-Apotheke, Haus der Stadtsparkasse and the Stadtwaage, the former weigh house (built in 1588), with an ornate Renaissance façade, and the nearby Essighaus, once a fine Renaissance town house. The façades and houses surrounding the market square were the first buildings in Bremen to be restored after World War II, by the citizens of Bremen themselves.
 St Peter's Cathedral (13th century), to the east of the Marktplatz, with sculptures of Moses and David, Peter and Paul and Charlemagne. The Bismarck Monument is also outside the cathedral, which is the only monument in Germany to depict Otto von Bismarck in an equestrian format.
 On Katherinenklosterhof to the northwest of the cathedral, a few remaining traces can be found of St Catherine's Monastery dating back to the thirteenth century.
 The Liebfrauenkirche (Our Lady's Church) is the oldest church of the town (11th century). Its crypt features several impressive murals from the fourteenth century.
 Off the south side of the Markplatz, the  Böttcherstraße was transformed in 1923–1931 by the coffee magnate Ludwig Roselius, who commissioned local artists to convert the narrow street (in medieval times, the street of the barrel makers) into an inspired mixture of Gothic and Art Nouveau. It was considered "entartete Kunst" (degenerate art) by the Nazis. Today, the street is one of Bremen's most popular attractions, with the Glockenspiel House at No. 4 with its carillon of Meissen porcelain bells.
 At the end of Böttcherstraße, by the Weser bank, stands the Martinikirche (St Martin's Church), a Gothic brick church built in 1229, and rebuilt in 1960 after its destruction in World War II.
 Tucked away between the Cathedral and the river is the Schnoor, a small, well-preserved area of crooked lanes, fishermen's and shipper's houses from the seventeenth and eighteenth centuries, now occupied by cafés, artisan shops and art galleries. The Convent of Saint Birgitta (Birgittenkloster) founded in 2002 is a small community of just seven nuns offering guest accommodation.
 Schlachte, the medieval harbour of Bremen (the modern port is some kilometres downstream) is today a riverside boulevard with pubs and bars aligned on one side and the banks of Weser on the other.
 The Viertel district to the east of the old town combines rows of nineteenth-century Bremen houses (Bremer Häuser) with museums and the theatres of Theater Bremen along the city's cultural mile.
 Knoops Park which is one of the larger green spaces in the city that many locals love to visit especially when the weather is warmer. There is also an option to rent small rowboats in the middle of the park.
 The Nasir Moschee is the first purpose built mosque of the Ahmadiyya Muslim Community in Bremen.

More contemporary tourist attractions include:
 Universum Science Center, a modern science museum
 The Rhododendron-Park Bremen, a major collection of rhododendrons and azaleas; also includes a botanical garden
 Botanika, a nature museum within the Rhododendron-Park Bremen that attempts be to the same as the Universum, but for biology
 Beck's Brewery, tours are available to the public which include beer tasting
 The Kunsthalle Bremen, an art museum with paintings from the nineteenth and twentieth century, maintained by the citizens of Bremen
 Focke Museum, museum of art and cultural history
 The Übersee Museum Bremen (Overseas (World) Museum) is a natural history and ethnographic museum near by the Central Station Bremen.
 The Kunstsammlungen Böttcherstraße, an art museum in expressionist architecture from Bernhard Hoetger with paintings from the twentieth century from Paula Modersohn-Becker
 The Weserburg Museum für moderne Kunst ("Weserburg Modern Art Museum"), a modern art museum located in the middle of the Weser River

Structures 

 Mediumwave transmitter Bremen
 Fallturm Bremen
 Bremen-Walle Telecommunication Tower

The Freie Waldorfschule in Bremen-Sebaldsbrück was Germany's first school built to the Passivhaus low-energy building standard.

Economy 
According to data from the Organization of Economic Cooperation and Development, Bremen had a GDP per capita of $53,379 in 2013, higher than the average for Germany as a whole. For comparison, in 2013, the World Bank reported Germany had a GDP per capita of $46,268, and the EU overall had a GDP per capita of $35,408 in the same year.

Bremen is the second development centre of the region, after Hamburg. It forms part of the production network of Airbus SAS and this is where equipping of the wing units for all widebody Airbus aircraft and the manufacture of small sheet metal parts takes place. Structural assembly, including that of metal landing flaps, is another focal point. Within the framework of Airbus A380 production, assembly of the landing flaps (high lift systems) is carried out here. The pre-final assembly of the fuselage section (excluding the cockpit) of the A400M military transport aircraft takes place before delivery on to Spain.

More than 3,100 persons are employed at Airbus Bremen, the second largest Airbus site in Germany. As part of the Centre of Excellence – Wing/Pylon, Bremen is responsible for the design and manufacture of high-lift systems for the wings of Airbus aircraft. The entire process chain for the high-lift elements is established here, including the project office, technology engineering, flight physics, system engineering, structure development, verification tests, structural assembly, wing equipping and ultimate delivery to the final assembly line. In addition, Bremen manufactures sheet metal parts like clips and thrust crests for all Airbus aircraft as part of the Centre of Excellence – Fuselage and Cabin.

In Bremen there is a plant of EADS Astrium and the headquarters of OHB-System, respectively the first and the third space companies of European Union.

There is also a Mercedes-Benz factory in Bremen, building the C, CLK, SL, SLK, and GLK series of cars.

Beck & Co's headlining brew Beck's and St Pauli Girl beers are brewed in Bremen. In past centuries when Bremen's port was the "key to Europe", the city also had a large number of wine importers, but the number is down to a precious few. Apart from that there is another link between Bremen and wine: about 800 years ago, quality wines were produced here. The largest wine cellar in the world is located in Bremen (below the city's main square), which was once said to hold over 1 million bottles, but during WWII was raided by occupying forces.

A large number of food producing or trading companies are located in Bremen with their German or European headquarters: Anheuser-Busch InBev (Beck's Brewery), Kellogg's, Kraft Foods (Kraft, Jacobs Coffee, Milka Chocolate, Milram, Miràcoli), Frosta (frosted food), Nordsee (chain of sea fast food), Melitta Kaffee, Eduscho Kaffee, Azul Kaffee, Vitakraft (pet articles and food for cats, dogs, birds, fish, rodents and other pets), Atlanta AG (Chiquita banana), chocolatier Hachez (fine chocolate and confiserie), feodora chocolatier.

Bremer Woll-Kämmerei (BWK), a worldwide operating company for manufacturing wool and trading in wool and similar products, is headquartered in Bremen. Gleistein is a German cordage factory with head office in Bremen.

Transport 

Trams in Bremen and local bus services are offered by the Bremer Straßenbahn AG (translates from German as Bremen Tramways Corporation), often abbreviated BSAG, the public transport provider for Bremen.

The Bremen S-Bahn covers the Bremen/Oldenburg Metropolitan Region, from Bremerhaven in the north to Twistringen in the south and from Oldenburg in the west, centred on Bremen Central Station. It has been in operation since 2010. This network unified existing regional transport in Bremen as well as surrounding cities, including Bremerhaven, Delmenhorst, Twistringen, Nordenham, Oldenburg, and Verden an der Aller. The network lies completely within the area of the Bremen-Lower Saxony Transport Association, whose tariff structure applies.

Events 
On August 8, 1992, in Weserstadion, Michael Jackson performed a show as part of his Dangerous World Tour. It was one of his three shows in Bremen and on his next and last tour he kicked off the next tour History World Tour in Bremen.
 Every year since 1036, in the last two weeks of October, Bremen has hosted the Freimarkt ("Free market"), one of the world's oldest and in Germany one of today's biggest continuously celebrated fairground festivals.
 Bremen is host to one of the four big annual Techno parades, the Vision Parade.
 Bremen is also host of the "Bremer 6 Tage Rennen" a bicycle race at the Bremen Arena.
 Every year the city plays host to young musicians from across the world, playing in the International Youth Symphony Orchestra of Bremen (IYSOB).
 On March 12, 1999, the rock band Kiss played a live show in Bremen. Before the show, they were told by the fire marshall not to use any fireworks. They did not use any fireworks until the very end, when they set off all of the fireworks at once. Because of this, they are now banned from playing in Bremen.
 Bremen was host to the 2006 RoboCup competition.
 Bremen was host to the 32nd Deutscher Evangelischer Kirchentag, 20–24 May 2009.
 Bremen hosted the 50th International Mathematical Olympiad (IMO) from 10–22 July 2009.
 The Rolling Stones named a Live Album "Bridges to Bremen", which was recorded 1998 in Bremen.

Sports 

Bremen is home to the football team Werder Bremen, who won the German Football Championship for the fourth time and the German Football Cup for the fifth time in 2004, making them only the fourth team in German football history to win the double; the club won the German Football Cup for the sixth time in 2009. Only Bayern Munich has won more titles. In the final match of the 2009–10 season, Werder Bremen lost to Bayern Munich. The home stadium of SV Werder Bremen is the Weserstadion, a pure football stadium, almost completely surrounded by solar cells. It is one of the biggest buildings in Europe delivering alternative energy.

Education 
With 18,000 students, the University of Bremen is the largest university in Bremen, and is also home to the international Goethe-Institut and the Fallturm Bremen. Additionally, Bremen has a University of the Arts and the Bremen University of Applied Sciences. In 2001, the private Jacobs University Bremen was founded. All major German research foundations maintain institutes in Bremen, with a focus on marine sciences: The Max Planck Society with the Max Planck Institute for Marine Microbiology, and the Gottfried Wilhelm Leibniz Scientific Community with the Center for Tropical Marine Ecology (zmt). The Bremerhaven-based Alfred-Wegener-Institute of the Helmholtz Association closely cooperates with the aforementioned institutes, especially within the MARUM a center for marine environmental sciences, affiliated to the University of Bremen. Furthermore, The Fraunhofer Society is present in Bremen with centers for applied material research (IFAM) and medical image computing (MEVIS).

Miscellaneous 
 In December 1949, Bremen hosted the lecture cycle Einblick in das, was ist by the philosopher Martin Heidegger, in which Heidegger introduced his concept of a "fourfold" of earth and sky, gods and mortals. This was also Heidegger's first public-speaking engagement following his removal from his Freiburg professorship by the Denazification authorities.
 Bremen is connected with a fairy tale by the Brothers Grimm, the Town Musicians of Bremen, although they never actually reach Bremen in the tale.
 The 1922 film Nosferatu, eine Symphonie des Grauens was set mostly in Bremen.
 In July 2022, Yorushika released a  song titled Bremen.

People

Twin towns – sister cities 

Bremen is twinned with:

 Gdańsk, Poland (1976)
 Riga, Latvia (1985)
 Dalian, China (1985)
 Rostock, Germany (1987)
 Haifa, Israel (1988)
 Bratislava, Slovakia (1989)
 Corinto, Nicaragua (1989)
 İzmir, Turkey (1995)
 Durban, South Africa (2011)

See also 

 List of mayors of Bremen

References

Notes

Bibliography 

 }
  Claus Christian (2007): A photographic excursion through Bremen, Bremen-North, Bremerhaven, Fischerhude and Worpswede, 
 
 
 
 Herbert Schwarzwälder (1995), Geschichte der Freien Hansestadt Bremen. Vol. I – V. Bremen: ,

External links 

 Official city website
 Official visitors information (various languages)
 Bremen City Panoramas – Panoramic Views and virtual Tours
 Official site of the city center
 Official site of the Schnoor quarter
 Official site of the shopping quarter Das Viertel
 Official site of the Weser promenade Schlachte 
 Official site of the shopping avenue Sögestraße
 Official site of the shopping mall Lloyd Passage
 Official site of the shopping quarter Ansgari Quartier
 Remnant from World War II in Bremen

 
German state capitals
Free imperial cities
Landmarks in Germany
Members of the Hanseatic League
Port cities and towns in Germany
Port cities and towns of the North Sea
Hanseatic Cities